Breaking Amish: Brave New World is an American reality television series on TLC. The series is a spin-off of Breaking Amish and encompasses the original cast from season one as they relocate and reside in Pinecraft, a small neighborhood located within Sarasota, Florida where there is a community of ex-Amish and Amish. It chronicles the lives of the cast as they endure the realities of living in new surroundings and face new situations involving work, friendship, romance, and lifestyle. It also includes the drama that develops between cast members as they undergo various experiences.

Cast

: Age at the time of filming.

Episodes

Reception
Allison Keene of The Hollywood Reporter says the show is struggling with authenticity.

References

2010s American reality television series
2013 American television series debuts
2013 American television series endings
American television spin-offs
English-language television shows
Amish in popular culture
Reality television spin-offs
TLC (TV network) original programming
Television shows set in Florida
Mennonitism in popular culture